SunCommon is a Vermont-based installer of residential solar power systems.  It is headquartered in Waterbury, Vermont. The business was co-founded by Duane Peterson and James Moore.

The company originated with advocacy group Vermont Public Interest Research Group (VPIRG), which in September 2010 started a program to install solar power and hot water systems for homeowners. To meet the demand for clean energy, a new entity was needed that could take in outside capital and scale up, so Duane and James launched SunCommon. SunCommon was officially launched in March 2012 after finding funding via private investment; when it began operations, it had 16 employees and annual revenue of about $2 million. SunCommon installed its 1,000th residential solar system in December 2014, and by late 2016 had reached 2,000 installations, with a workforce of about 100.  Its 2015 revenue was about $22 million.

In May 2018, SunCommon expanded into New York after merging with Hudson Solar. As of March 2020, SunCommon employed 189 people and added over 80 Megawatts of solar to the electric grids of Vermont and New York. This number includes over 8,000 residences and 37 Community Solar Arrays.

Products

Residential Solar 
SunCommon installs both roof and ground mounted systems in both Vermont and New York.  As of March 2020, they have installed over 8,000 residential systems.

Solar Canopy 
The Solar Canopy is a unique stand-alone structure with bifacial solar panels. The Solar Canopy comes in single, double, and triple bay sizes and is now offered in both Vermont and New York. The frame is built using sculpted beams from New Energy Works in Rochester, New York. SunCommon Solar Canopies cover the parking lots of notable businesses in Vermont, such as the Hunger Mountain Co-Op and the Alchemist brewery.

Community Solar 
Community Solar is a new way to be powered by solar energy without having to put solar panels on your home. SunCommon has installed many Community Solar Arrays (CSAs) throughout Vermont and New York. Some of their most notable CSAs are in New York.

Orange County Citizens Foundation Community Solar Array 
The CSA at the Orange County Citizens Foundation (OCCF) in Sugar Loaf, NY hosts solar panels on the foundation's land, capable of powering over 60 area homes and businesses. SunCommon announced a grant to local artists for an outdoor installation near the CSA at the 55-acre Seligmann Center at OCCF. The winners of the grant were Maxine Leu and Michael Asbill. The sculptures double as a shelter and a food source for local wildlife. One of the installations is planted with blackberries and grapes, and the other element is essentially a giant bird feeder.

The Pointe of Praise Family Life Center Community Solar Array 
This CSA in Kingston, NY was built in two phases and has the capacity to serve about 60 households. "The Pointe of Praise church has received panels in exchange for the use of their land to host the array... They are donating 75 percent of their panels to low- and moderate-income seniors in the congregation. Pollinator-friendly vegetation will be planted around the array."

Red Hook Community Solar Array 
In January 2020, SunCommon hosted a ribbon cutting event for their CSA in Red Hook, NY. "The project will power municipal buildings in Tivoli, Red Hook, and local homes. Red Hook officials say this will save the community thousands each year, providing electric bill credits to 270 homes and 16 municipal electric accounts."

Columbia County's First Community Solar Array 
In December 2017, "the New York State Energy Research and Development Authority (NYSERDA) and Hudson Solar (now SunCommon) announced the completion of the first community solar project in Columbia County. This 214 kilowatt CSA is located on one acre... and can accommodate up to 40 customers. The solar system is located in the town of Clermont and the will provide environmental benefits by removing about 71 metric tons of CO2 from the atmosphere."

Home Energy Storage 
SunCommon offers home energy storage in Vermont and New York. The grid-tied solar and battery back-up systems work together to keep the critical loads of a home running during power outages. Homeowners are able to generate clean, automatic, silent back-up power. In February 2019, SunCommon partnered with Vermont's largest utility, Green Mountain Power, to pilot a home energy storage program.

Small Business & Commercial Solar 
SunCommon has helped business owners in every sector, including manufacturing, retail, healthcare, agriculture, office and apartment buildings, hospitality and more, go solar. Some of their most noteworthy commercial installations include:

The Alchemist (Stowe, VT) 
The Alchemist brewery teamed up with SunCommon in 2018 to build Vermont’s first large-scale solar-covered parking lot. The parking lot holds two large Solar Canopies made up of nearly 400 solar panels, and covers 31 parking spots.

Caledonia Spirits (Montpelier, VT) 
The new Montpelier headquarters of Caledonia Spirits features a roof of solar panels installed by SunCommon.

Other Product Offerings 
SunCommon also installs Solar Heating & Cooling, as well as Electric Vehicle (EV) Chargers for residences.

Awards & Recognitions
 SunCommon was #22 on the Real Leaders Top 100 Impact Company in 2019.
 SunCommon was named one of the Best Places to Work in Vermont.
 SunCommon was recognized as a “Best For The World” B Corp for environmental excellence.
 James Moore (SunCommon Co-Founder) received the 2019 Renewable Energy Innovation Award from Renewable Energy Vermont.
 Duane Peterson (SunCommon Co-Founder) received the Terry Ehrich Award for Excellence in Socially Responsible Business.
 SunCommon is recognized as a NYSERDA Quality Solar Installer. "Contractors that earn the NYSERDA Quality Solar Installers designation consistently meet high standards of quality. Hiring a NYSERDA Quality Solar Installer means you're choosing an installer who exceeds annual quality assurance criteria backed by New York State and consistently provides top tier performance and quality."
 SunCommon is registered with the Better Business Bureau.

Responsible Business Practices
SunCommon is a Certified BCorp (B Corporation) in Vermont and New York State, having passed a rigorous assessment of responsible business practices. Certified B Corporations are a new kind of business that balances purpose and profit. They are legally required to consider the impact of their decisions on their workers, customers, suppliers, community, and the environment. SunCommon is also a Public Benefit Corporation.

SunCommon's Vermont headquarters is a Net-Positive Office Building, meaning the building produces more energy than it uses. SunCommon's New York office was determined by NESEA (the Northeast Sustainable Energy Association) to have become the first proven zero-net energy commercial building in New York State and the ten northeast United States (October 2008). The building consumes less energy than it generates, using a solar electric system to generate power from the sun, geothermal heating and cooling, and solar thermal collectors to heat all its hot water. SunCommon also created the Drive Electric Pledge, in which they pledged not to purchase or lease any fossil fuel burning vehicles as long as there are viable electric alternatives.

SunCommon offers employees Student Debt Paydown and Paid Family Leave.

Duane Peterson (SunCommon Co-Founder) participates in Change The Story Vermont's "Champions for Change". This group "uses their personal and collective leadership to elevate gender equity as an issue of social and economic importance in [Vermont]. Champions for Change meets regularly and takes action on pay equity." SunCommon also sponsors organizations such as Vermont Works for Women and their "Women Can Do" and "Rosie's Girls" programs. SunCommon has also worked with the Vermont Youth Lobby to help encourage students to take an active role in their government. Additionally, in 2018, SunCommon built small trailers that brought charging stations, water filtration and lighting to Puerto Rico, which was devastated by Hurricane Maria. Finally, SunCommon frequently hosts Holiday Giving Campaigns. They have partnered with local organizations such as the Vermont Foodbank and Habitat for Humanity to address prevalent issues like food insecurity and the lack of affordable housing.

Community Event Work
SunCommon participates in community events across New York and Vermont. They have attended educational events, such as the SUNY Educational Summit, and have created their own events, like the SunCarnival and the Climate Action Film Festival.

References

External links
Official website

Companies based in Waterbury, Vermont
Solar energy companies of the United States
Energy companies established in 2011